Helia agna is a species of moth in the family Erebidae. It is found in North America. The MONA or Hodges number for Helia agna is 8657.

References

Further reading

 
 
 

Omopterini